Olivier Pantaloni (born 13 December 1966) is French football manager and former player. He is the current manager of Ligue 1 side AC Ajaccio.

Club career
Pantaloni played as a striker for Nice, SC Bastia, AS Saint-Étienne, Martigues, Gazélec Ajaccio and AC Ajaccio.

Managerial career
Pantaloni has held various positions in AC Ajaccio's staff since 2001. When assistant coach in September 2004, he was put in interim charge when Dominique Bijotat was sacked with the team in last place in Ligue 1, and held this position for a month until the appointment of Rolland Courbis. 

In December 2008, Pantaloni ended a six-month hiatus by returning to Ligue 2 Ajaccio, being named assistant to José Pasqualetti in the new year and succeeding him upon his resignation in February. In 2010–11, his first full season, he led the club to promotion as runners-up behind Évian TG, ending a five-year exile from the top flight; he resigned in June 2012, having kept them up with a 16th-place finish.

Pantaloni had his first job outside of ACA in June 2013, signing a two-year deal at Ligue 2 club Tours FC. He resigned in October 2014 with the club second from last, having lost eight of eleven fixtures. He returned to familiar surroundings days later, replacing the sacked Christian Bracconi at 12th-place Ajaccio. In 2017–18, he led the club to a promotion play-off place, and they defeated Le Havre before a 4–0 aggregate loss to Toulouse. He led Ajaccio to a 2nd place finish in the 2021–22 season, securing promotion to Ligue 1.

References

1966 births
Living people
Sportspeople from Bastia
French footballers
Footballers from Corsica
Association football forwards
Ligue 1 players
Ligue 2 players
Championnat National players
Championnat National 2 players
Championnat National 3 players
OGC Nice players
SC Bastia players
AS Saint-Étienne players
FC Martigues players
AC Ajaccio players
French football managers
Ligue 1 managers
Ligue 2 managers
AC Ajaccio managers
Tours FC managers